Maria Patrizia Grieco (born February 1, 1952) is an Italian corporate executive. She was the chairman of Enel (2014-20), the director of Anima Holding and CNH Industrial, and a board member of Save the Children.

Early life and education
Grieco graduated in Law at the University of Milan

Career
Grieco began her career in 1977 in Italtel, where she was appointed director of legal and general affairs in 1994, director-general in 1999 and managing director in 2002.

Over the years she has held various managerial roles in a number of large companies, including:

 managing director at Siemens Informatica (2003–2006)
 managing director at Value Team, today NTT DATA (2006)
 managing director at Olivetti (2008–2013), then chairman (2011–2014) 
 manager at Fiat Industrial (from 2012), today CNH Industrial
 director at Anima Holding (from 2014)
 board member of Assonime (from 2014)

In May 2014, Grieco became chairperson of the board of Enel.

Other activities

Corporate boards 
 Endesa, Independent Member of the Board of Directors (since 2021)
 Amplifon, Non-Executive Independent Member of the Board of Directors (since 2021)

Non-profit organizations 
 Bocconi University, Member of the Board (since 2019)
 Istituto Affari Internazionali (IAI), Member of the Board 
 Trilateral Commission, Member (since 2015)
 Save the Children, Member of the Board (since 2010)
 Bellisario Prize, Member of the Honour Committee

Awards
 In 2000, Grieco was awarded the Bellisario prize, a recognition for women who have distinguished themselves professionally, in management, science, or economics, nationally and internationally.

Bibliography

References

1952 births
Living people
Businesspeople from Milan
Italian corporate directors